The 1968 Holy Cross Crusaders football team was an American football team that represented the College of the Holy Cross as an independent during the 1968 NCAA University Division football season. For the second year, Tom Boisture served as head coach. The team compiled a record of 3–6–1.

All home games were played at Fitton Field on the Holy Cross campus in Worcester, Massachusetts.

Schedule

Statistical leaders
Statistical leaders for the 1968 Crusaders included: 
 Rushing: Steve Jutras, 642 yards and 7 touchdowns on 161 attempts
 Passing: Phil O'Neil, 1,067 yards, 79 completions and 7 touchdowns on 157 attempts
 Receiving: Bob Neary, 677 yards and 6 touchdowns on 47 receptions
 Scoring: Steve Jutras, 48 points from 8 touchdowns
 Total offense: Phil O'Neil, 1,016 yards (1,067 passing, minus-51 rushing)
 All-purpose yards: Steve Jutras, 698 yards (642 rushing, 56 receiving)

References

Holy Cross
Holy Cross Crusaders football seasons
Holy Cross Crusaders football